Wanstead Manor was a manor, historically in the English county of Essex and now in the London Borough of Redbridge. It centred on the manorhouse of Wanstead Hall, later demolished to build Wanstead House.

The manor is said to have been granted to the monks of Westminster Abbey in Saxon times by Abbot Aelfric, though this cannot be substantiated from any documentary evidence. However, the location was clearly  a prized site on the east side of London. In 1086 the Domesday Book states that Wanstead Manor was held from the Bishop of London by one Ralph son of Brian. Wanstead was then densely wooded, being situated within the Forest of Essex. It was part of the forest bailiwick of Becontree during the Middle Ages and later of the Leyton "Walk".

References

Sources 
Wanstead House and the Parklands - a History, www.wansteadwildlife.org.uk. (June 2010). This article has drawn heavily from this source.
Cornish, Alan. M.Sc. Wanstead Park - A Chronicle. (Originally published by the Friends of Wanstead Parklands in  1982, updated and republished by Wanstead Parklands Community Project in 2006.)
Starkey, David. Henry: Virtuous Prince. London, 2008.(Tudor history of Wanstead)
Ramsey, Winston G. & Fowkes, Reginald L. Epping Forest: Then and Now. Published by Battle of Britain Prints International Ltd., 1986.

External links
City of London website
Wren Conservation Group
The Friends of Wanstead Parklands
Follies and Monuments - Wanstead Park

Manors in Essex
History of the London Borough of Redbridge